The James A. Beck House, also known as the Sloca House, is a historic residence located in Fairfield, Iowa, United States.  Beck was a Fairfield native who owned  a grocery business, before starting a profitable career as a hotelier.  He had this Queen Anne house built in 1896.  It is based on a pattern designed by the  George F. Barber & Co. of Knoxville, Tennessee.  It is similar to the Linsay House in Iowa City, which was built closer to the original pattern.  The 2½-story frame house follows an irregular plan and it is built on a stone foundation.  It features a polygonal turret that rises from the second floor over the wrap-around porch.  The porch itself features a circular pavilion that is capped by a flattened conical roof.  A two-story carriage house is located behind the main house.  It dates from 1875 when the previous house on this property was built, and was renovated to reflect the Queen Anne house.  The Beck House was listed on the National Register of Historic Places in 1978.

References

Houses completed in 1896
Queen Anne architecture in Iowa
Houses in Fairfield, Iowa
National Register of Historic Places in Jefferson County, Iowa
Houses on the National Register of Historic Places in Iowa